The Prayer of Manasses, also known as the Prayer of Manasseh is a short work of 15 verses recording a penitential prayer attributed to king Manasseh of Judah.

Its canonicity is disputed. The majority of scholars believe that the Prayer of Manasseh was written in Greek (while a minority argues for a Semitic original) in the second or first century BC. It is recognised that it could also have been written in the first half of the 1st century AD, but in any case before the Destruction of the Second Temple in 70 AD. Another work by the same title, written in Hebrew, was found among the Dead Sea Scrolls (4Q381:17).

Origin
Manasseh is recorded in the Bible as one of the most idolatrous kings of Judah. The second Book of Chronicles, but not the second Book of Kings, records that Manasseh was taken captive by the Assyrians. While a prisoner, Manasseh prayed for mercy, and upon being freed and restored to the throne turned from his idolatrous ways.

Canonicity
The prayer appears in ancient Syriac, Old Slavonic, Ethiopic, and Armenian translations. In the Ethiopian Bible, the prayer is found in 2 Chronicles. The earliest Greek text is the fifth-century Codex Alexandrinus. A Hebrew manuscript of the prayer was found in Cairo Geniza. It is considered apocryphal by Jews, Catholics and Protestants. It was placed at the end of 2 Chronicles in the late 4th-century Vulgate. Over a millennium later, Martin Luther included the prayer in his 74-book translation of the Bible into German. It was part of the 1537 Matthew Bible, and the 1599 Geneva Bible. It also appears in the Apocrypha of the King James Bible and of the original 1609/1610 Douai-Rheims Bible. Pope Clement VIII included the prayer in an appendix to the Vulgate.

The prayer is included in some editions of the Greek Septuagint. For example, the 5th century Codex Alexandrinus includes the prayer among fourteen Odes appearing just after the Psalms.  It is accepted as a deuterocanonical book by Orthodox Christians. The prayer is chanted during the Orthodox Christian and Byzantine Catholic service of Great Compline. It is used in the Roman Rite as part of the Responsory after the first reading in the Office of Readings on the 14th Sunday in Ordinary Time (along with Psalm 51). In the Extraordinary Form, in the Roman Rite Breviary; in the corpus of responsories sung with the readings from the books of Kings between Trinity Sunday and August, the seventh cites the Prayer of Manasseh, together with verses of Psalm 50, the penitential Psalm par excellence. It is used also as a canticle in the Daily Office of the 1979 U.S. Book of Common Prayer used by the Episcopal Church in the United States of America, and as Canticle 52 in Common Worship: Daily Prayer of the Church of England.

See also
 Deuterocanonical books in Orthodox Christianity

References

External links

Complete translations of Prayer of Manasseh from earlyjewishwritings.com
Another translation, with notes from bombaxo.com
1611 King James Bible from kingjamesbibleonline.org
 Good News Bible (Anglicised) at Bible.com
 New Revised Standard Version at Bible Gateway
 Prayer of Manasses at LibriVox (public domain audiobooks)

2nd-century BC books
1st-century BC books
Old Testament pseudepigrapha
Anagignoskomena
Jewish prayer and ritual texts
Texts in the Septuagint
Jewish apocrypha